Sir Gilbert Heathcote, 3rd Baronet (died 2 November 1785) of Normanton Park, Rutland was a British Member of Parliament.

Heathcote was the son of Sir John Heathcote, 2nd Baronet, and Bridget, daughter of Thomas White and was educated at Queens' College, Cambridge. He succeeded to the baronetcy and to Normanton Park on his father's death in 1759. In 1761, he was elected to the House of Commons for Shaftesbury, a seat he held until 1768.

Heathcote married firstly Lady Margaret, daughter of Philip Yorke, 1st Earl of Hardwicke, in 1749. After his first wife's death in 1769, he married secondly Elizabeth, daughter of Robert Hudson, in 1770. He died in November 1785 and was succeeded by his son from his second marriage, Gilbert.

References

Year of birth unknown
1785 deaths
Alumni of Queens' College, Cambridge
Baronets in the Baronetage of Great Britain
Gilbert
Members of the Parliament of Great Britain for English constituencies
British MPs 1761–1768